The 1988 Swan Premium Open was a tennis tournament played on indoor hard courts at the Sydney Entertainment Centre in Sydney, Australia and was part of the 1988 Nabisco Grand Prix. It was the 16th edition of the tournament and ran from 10 through 16 October 1988. Fifth-seeded Slobodan Živojinović won the singles title.

Finals

Singles

 Slobodan Živojinović defeated  Richard Matuszewski 7–6, 6–3, 6–4
 It was Živojinović's 2nd title of the year and the 9th of his career.

Doubles

 Darren Cahill /  John Fitzgerald defeated  Martin Davis /  Brad Drewett 6–3, 6–2
 It was Cahill's 4th title of the year and the 7th of his career. It was Fitzgerald's 4th title of the year and the 21st of his career.

References

External links
 International Tennis Federation (ITF) – tournament edition details